CBBC (initialised as Children's BBC and also known as the CBBC Channel) is a British free-to-air public broadcast children's television channel owned and operated by the BBC. It is also the brand used for all BBC content for children aged 6–12. Its sister channel, CBeebies, broadcasts programming and content for children aged 5 and under. It broadcasts every day from 7am to 7pm; timesharing with BBC Three.

History

Launched on 11 February 2002 alongside its sister channel, CBeebies, the name was previously used to brand all content on BBC One and BBC Two aimed at children. CBBC was named the Channel of the Year at the Children's BAFTA awards in 2008, 2012 and 2015. The channel averages 300,000 views per day.

The channel originally shared bandwidth with BBC Choice, and later BBC Three, meaning that CBBC needed to sign off every night at 7pm. On 22 August 2008, it was announced that the channel would be available live on its website from 16 September. CBBC's reach further expanded with the addition of the channel on Sky in Ireland on 12 May 2011. The British Forces Broadcasting Service have provided viewers with CBBC and CBeebies since 1 April 2013, when they replaced BFBS Kids.

In 2016, CBBC's broadcast hours were extended by two hours to 9pm due to the discontinuation of BBC Three as a linear channel. It was stated that the additional hours would be used to provide programming for teenagers.

On 2 March 2021, due to the return of BBC Three as a broadcast channel, it was announced that CBBC's broadcast hours would be reduced by two hours, as was the case prior to the 2016 relaunch.

On 26 May 2022, the BBC announced plans for CBBC and BBC Four to be discontinued as linear television services in 2025 as part of cutbacks and other changes focusing on creating a "digital-first" BBC. Under the plan, CBBC would exclusively operate as a content hub on iPlayer, as BBC Three had done before it was relaunched in 2022.

On 15 March 2023, CBBC rebranded its on-screen bug and identity to match the BBC's 2021 logo, dropping the 2016 logo which had been used for 7 years.

Management
Along with CBeebies, CBBC is operated by the BBC Children's and Education department. BBC Children's was originally based in the East Tower of BBC Television Centre since the department's inception, but moved to MediaCityUK in Salford in September 2011, and the live presentation links used throughout the day are now recorded and broadcast from there.

Programming

CBBC's programming output is very similar to the strand previously shown on BBC One. CBBC often complements this strand with programmes shown earlier than on the terrestrial channels, repeats or whole series shown in a day, alongside other exclusive commissions.

Most viewed programmes
The following is a list of the ten most watched shows on CBBC, based on Live +7 data supplied by BARB.

Educational programming
As part of CBBC's original remit, CBBC needed to show 1,000 hours of factual and schools programmes per year. The service managed this by introducing the Class TV, which would air educational programming for two hours each day in the late morning, with normal programming resuming in the early afternoon. Much of this programming was old BBC Schools programming shown, in some cases, decades before and which was for the most part still relevant. Very little new schools programmes were commissioned. Class TV ended in March 2008, following a change to CBBC's remit. However, in December 2019, CBBC brought back Class TV with 'Live Lessons' presented by the CBBC presenting team on late weekday mornings.

During the COVID-19 pandemic and the closure of schools around the country, CBBC broadcast educational programming for primary school children. This included a mixture of programmes which were new or they aired on CBBC many years before, with a focus on learning as well as newly recorded content. It was hoped that this might help children without the financial means to participate in lessons over the internet.

Presentation

CBBC has had a relatively similar presentation to that of its strand counterpart. The logo has consistently remained the same until 2016 as the service; green coloured blobs at the beginning of its life and the green and white logo from September 2007 until now. The logo today is all different colours unlike the last one. CBBC has mainly utilised presenters from the main service, with a few presenters appearing mostly on the new channel; Gemma Hunt and Anne Foy being notable examples and appearing consistently until August 2007. At the beginning of September 2007, along with the relaunch, the same presenters of CBBC would also feature on CBBC on BBC One and Two.

When CBBC launched, presentation was located in TC2 at BBC Television Centre, where the channel shared studio facilities with CBBC's original magazine show Xchange. This changed in Autumn 2004, when CBBC moved to TC9 following the normal CBBC links move to TC10; however, this was changed in March 2006 so that all CBBC and CBBC channel links were located in TC9. A further change was to take place in December 2006 when all output moved to a Chroma key set within TC12, and was presented by only one presenter. This short live decision lasted until the relaunch in 2007, which involved a new 'office' set being constructed, initially in TC12 and then in a new studio facility in the East Tower of Television Centre.

In 2011, CBBC moved to television studios HQ5 and HQ6 at Dock10 studios in MediaCityUK, and has been presented from there since September 2011. The Office has been through a number of revamps since then, two in 2015, the first one being a minor change because of the Go CBBC app, and another one in May which entirely changed some of the structure, adding a post chute and an Up Next screen, and one so far in 2016, due to CBBC's new look, gaining a smaller desk, an extra Up Next screen, and renaming it 'CBBC HQ'.

In 2022, it was announced that CBBC (which had seen a drop in ratings), with BBC Four and Radio Four Extra, was planned to move online, with its shows intended to run exclusively on the iPlayer service within three years. This decision was heavily panned by BBC's audience, with many touting the linear channel as still necessary for its demographic. The audience CBBC was trying to reach did not watch live TV as much as they used to.

Previous logos

Other services

CBBC Extra
CBBC Extra is a free interactive television service from CBBC provided by the BBC Red Button. It is accessible from CBBC by pressing red and then selecting CBBC Extra from the main menu. It can also be accessed from any other BBC channel by pressing red and going to page number 570. The service differs across digital platforms, for example Sky viewers can access a video loop. After a brief stint with a temporary producer the channel really took off under producer and director Brendan Sheppard who spearheaded its success. After Sheppard had finished work on the BAFTA nominated Nelly Nut Live he was asked by CBBC controller Gary August to work on CBBC Extra and under Sheppard the show received a new brand look, idents, graphics and it introduced feature items such as Ask Aaron and a Halloween special with Basil Brush, there was a Doctor Who special with sequences featuring K9 that had to be cut at the last minute and a documentary series called Really Living It! Sheppard was then asked to direct DinoSapien in Canada and a new producer was installed with Sheppard later moving on to Doctor Who. Its availability on Freeview is dependent upon BBC Red Button not showing other interactive services, such as major sports events coverage. The service offers numerous features including Newsround, horoscopes, Chris/Dodge's blog, viewer content and jokes and other interactive elements.

From 2013 to 2016, CBBC Extra was available on the CBBC website, until the channel was discontinued in May 2016.

CBBC Online

The CBBC website provides a wide range of activities for viewers aged 6–15, such as games, videos, puzzles, printable pages, pre-moderated message boards and frequently updated news feeds. It contains pages for the majority of its current programming with various content on each. There are also micro-sites from Newsround and MOTD Kickabout, providing children with news and sport, as well as the CBBC on BBC iPlayer to replay CBBC programmes for up to thirty days.

CBBC HD

In July 2013, BBC announced that CBBC HD would be launched by early 2014. The channel launched on 10 December 2013. CBBC HD broadcasts on the BBC's existing HD multiplex on Freeview and shares its stream with BBC Three HD as they air at different times.

Before launch, the majority of CBBC HD output was broadcast on BBC HD before its closure in March 2013. CBBC HD was added to the Sky EPG in Ireland in 2017.

From July to August 2014, CBBC HD was temporarily removed from Freeview during the 2014 Commonwealth Games to let BBC Three and BBC Three HD broadcast 24 hours a day, similar to how BBC Parliament was removed during the 2008 Summer Olympics and 2012 Summer Olympics.

From March to April 2018, CBBC HD used downtime mode to let BBC Red Button HD broadcast 9pm to 5:30am on Sky and Freeview. After the close, CBBC HD began to use 24 hours again.

Since the launch of BBC Scotland, CBBC HD began finishing at 19:00 in Scotland on Freeview, due to the channel timesharing with BBC Scotland HD, which starts at 19:00, however, CBBC SD continued to finish at 21:00 in Scotland until hours were cut nationwide in January 2022.

Following the closure of CBBC HD, the BBC has decided to cut back CBBC's air time from 9pm to 7pm, this is also due to BBC Three making a return to linear TV after it being online only since 2016.

CBBC Alba
In September 2018 as part of a branding strategy, the unbranded 2-hour children's block on BBC Alba was split into CBeebies Alba and CBBC Alba, with the former airing during the first hour and the latter airing during the second hour. This block features its own presentation, presenters and shows all dubbed into Scottish Gaelic.

Previously, a similar block called Children's BBC Scotland was aired in the Scottish school holidays throughout the 1990s. The block consisted of repeats and local programming as well as regional versions of the summer holiday mid-morning slot and the Children's BBC Breakfast Show.

International versions

Australia
On 15 March 2021, it was announced by Australian provider Fetch TV that they would launch a channel called "BBC Kids" (unrelated to a Canadian BBC-branded channel of the same name) on 24 April 2021 to replace Cartoon Network and Boomerang. It is essentially a version of CBBC for the country, as it's aimed at the same target audience as CBBC and airs children's programmes from the BBC Studios catalogue.

United States
On 11 January 2022, an American version of BBC Kids launched as a FAST channel on Pluto TV. This version, as is the Australian version, airs children's programming from the BBC Studios catalog, and also airs pre-school content from CBeebies as well. A version of the channel that airs Spanish-dubbed programming titled "Niños por BBC" was launched on the same day.

See also

 BBC Children's and Education – BBC's children's division the holds CBBC.
 CBeebies – BBC's children television channel; serves under-6-year-old children and is a sister channel of CBBC.
 CBBC idents – identities used by the channel.

References

Notes

External links

1985 establishments in the United Kingdom
BBC television channels in the United Kingdom
Children's television networks
Children's television channels in the United Kingdom
Commercial-free television networks
Mass media in Salford
Organisations based in Salford
Television channels and stations established in 2002
Television channels in the United Kingdom